Dikhololo is a game reserve in the North West Province of South Africa, located  outside of Brits. Dikhololo provides a bush experience at this game farm and family friendly resort. Animals roam freely, offering guests thrilling and close-up sightings of Giraffes, a variety of Buck, Zebras, Jackals, dozens of Bird species and more. Family holiday memories are made here, with its varied facilities, and fun entertainment programmes.

It is a publicly accessible resort, providing lodging in chalets grouped into camps throughout the reserve, some between low hills.

Animals that roam the reserve freely include various antelope: Burchell's zebra, giraffe, common duiker, steenbok, blesbok, impala, blue wildebeest, red hartebeest, waterbuck, nyala, kudu and eland and other wildlife.

Various recreational facilities exist, from swimming pools (one heated) through water slides, flood-lit tennis courts, putt-putt, quad biking and game drives.

The resort attracts visitors from the surrounding areas or nearby Pretoria and Johannesburg.

External links 
Official Dikhololo Homepage

Protected areas of North West (South African province)
Nature reserves in South Africa

Management Company